Öykü Çelik (born 13 July 1987) is a Turkish actress.

Biography
Çelik was born in 1987 in Istanbul. Her father is a football coach. She studied at the Bilkent University Theater Department but was forced to leave the school temporarily after suffering from injuries and burns in an accident. She then continued her education by taking private theater lessons. Çelik has since appeared in many TV series. She made her debut on television in 2006 with a role in the series Selena. She continued her career by appearing in series such as Bir Zamanlar Osmanlı: Kıyam and Poyraz Karayel. In 2019, she starred in the historical drama Diriliş: Ertuğrul.

Personal life
Öykü Çelik married Ahmet Murat Çakan in 2014 in Bursa, however the couple divorced the next year. In 2020, she started dating Ismail Berhan.

Filmography

References

External links 
 
 

1987 births
Living people
Turkish film actresses
Turkish television actresses